Hypopta guiguasia is a moth in the family Cossidae. It is found in Venezuela.

References

Natural History Museum Lepidoptera generic names catalog

Hypopta
Moths described in 1916